Out-of-home (OOH) advertising, also called outdoor advertising, outdoor media, and out-of-home media, is advertising experienced outside of the home. This includes billboards, wallscapes, and posters seen while "on the go". It also includes place-based media seen in places such as convenience stores, medical centers, salons, and other brick-and-mortar venues. OOH advertising formats fall into four main categories: billboards, street furniture, transit, and alternative.

The OOH advertising industry in the United States includes more than 2,100 operators in 50 states representing the major out of home format categories. These OOH media companies range from public, multinational media corporations to small, independent, family-owned businesses. Currently, the United Kingdom and France are Western Europe's first and second largest markets for OOH, respectively. Data from Outsmart (formerly the Outdoor Media Centre), the UK's out-of-home advertising trade association, shows that digital out-of-home (DOOH) grew at a 29.7% CAGR from 2009 to 2014.

Overview 

Billboard advertising is a traditional OOH advertising format, but there has been significant growth in digital OOH (digital billboards and place-based networks) in recent years. For example, about 4,900 digital billboard displays have been installed in China and the US.

Traditional roadside billboards remain the predominant form of OOH advertising in the US with 66% of total annual revenue. Today, billboard revenue is 73% local ads, 18% national ads, and 9% public service ads.

Street furniture is made up of formats such as bus shelters, news racks, mall kiosks, and telephone booth advertising. This form of OOH advertising is mainly seen in urban centers. This form of advertising provides benefits to communities, as building and maintaining the shelters people use while waiting for buses.

Transit advertising is typically advertising placed on anything which moves, such as buses, subway advertising, truckside, food trucks, and taxis, but also includes fixed static and electronic advertising at train and bus stations and platforms. Airport advertising, which addresses a traveling audience, is included in this category. Advertising on metro trains is becoming very popular these days, particularity in India. Municipalities often accept this form of advertising, as it provides revenue to city and port authorities. Walking billboard, vehicle branding, pamphlet distributions, road shows etc. are some more forms of transit media advertisements. 

Street furniture, transit, and alternative media formats comprise 34% of total outdoor revenue in the US. Some of these formats have a higher percentage of national ads than traditional billboards.

Digital out-of-home 
Digital out-of-home (DOOH) refers to dynamic media distributed across place-based networks in venues including, but not limited to: cafes, grocery stores, bars, restaurants, health clubs, colleges, arenas, gas stations, convenience stores, barber shops, airports and public spaces. PQ Media defines DOOH by two major platforms, digital place-based networks (DPN) and digital billboards & signage (DBB);  DOOH networks typically feature independently addressable screens, kiosks, jukeboxes and/or jumbotrons. DOOH media benefits location owners and advertisers alike in being able to engage customers and/or audiences and extend the reach and effectiveness of marketing messages.  It is also referred to as digital signage.

In the US the DOOH industry is expected to grow to $3.25 billion in 2021, representing 36% of the total OOH spending.

The reason that this category is growing so rapidly is because busy people are typically busy at home and with the introduction and acceptance of digital video recorders (DVRs), it has diluted the frequency with which traditional TV commercials are viewed. Every day more TV viewers are skipping past commercials with their DVRs, making out-of-home advertising more appealing. A Nielsen media research study in 2009 showed that 91% of DVR owners skipped commercials. As a result, traditional TV advertisers are hungry for an effective substitute, and digital out-of-home ads appear to be one of the solutions. Digital out of home advertising seems to be a cost-effective way for promoting or marketing any brand or product. Usage of billboards and displays for brand promotion is a less expensive way of advertising than TV, radio, newspapers and other mediums.

DOOH includes stand-alone screens, screens on buildings, kiosks, and interactive media found in public places.  The availability of inexpensive LCD screens with built-in media players has opened the door for companies to add interactive video messages in point of purchase (POP) displays.  The displays allow consumers to get additional information at the moment of decision on a product or service.  Growth in the DOOH industry has been increasing in 2009, with more POP manufacturers, advertisers, and content developers moving to digital. Technological improvements are holding down costs, and low-cost digital signage is making it easier to reach consumers on a larger scale. For example, beacons are small devices placed on out-of-home advertising structures that use Bluetooth technology to connect with mobile devices.

DOOH is present in a variety of venues including gas stations, grocery stores, restaurants, gyms and ride-sharing vehicles.

With digital TVs in gas stations, nearly 52 million customers are getting snippets of weather, sports highlights, celebrity gossip and commercials with their gas each month, according to Nielsen. The weekly reach is actually larger than most of the prime-time TV shows. The largest company in the space is Gas Station TV with 27.5 million monthly viewers at more than 1,100 stations across the US, according to Nielsen. In addition to the large number of viewers, the audience profile of TVs at gas stations is unique. All are drivers and 76% are adults from age 18-49 with a median age of 40 and median household income over $70,000. According to the Nielsen Intercept Studies, 89% of the consumers are engaged and watching TV at the gas station and 88% love watching when fueling because they have nothing else to do.

In supermarkets, networks like Grocery TV and Starlite Media have established digital screens at various points in grocery stores to provide brands with opportunities to reach customers along their purchase journey. In addition to building brand awareness some of these networks are also able to tie direct results such as sales lift to advertising campaigns.

In gyms, Zoom Media (GymTV) engages fitness-minded audiences with lifestyle content, fitness tips, and music.

In 2015, DOOH has also started to extend to in-transit advertising. Tablets are installed inside ride-sharing vehicles like Uber, Lyft and Grab. Digital ads are displayed inside the screens allowing brands to reach high-value passengers. This type of DOOH leverages technology to improve ad distribution and better OOH audience targeting. GPS of tablets are used to enable location-based marketing. Brands can specify geo-fences to determine where their ads will be shown to passengers.

Programmatic out-of-home 

Within the DOOH industry, advertisements may be purchased through programmatic platforms. Programmatic platforms ask marketers to specify desired audience characteristics and automatically locate the media vehicles to deliver that audience. These platforms may allow buyers (the demand side) to plan, execute and monitor campaigns across multiple media platforms (the supply side) using a familiar workflow. A major difference between programmatic digital out-of-home (pDOOH) and traditional OOH or DOOH is that programmatic automates the process of buying, selling and delivering inventory across multiple screens with enhanced capabilities. These enhanced capabilities include the creation of measurable, highly-targeted campaigns by utilizing geolocation data to activate the best DOOH screens in real-time based on consumer behaviour and audience movement patterns. Additionally, programmatic allows buyers to set specific parameters or conditions (also known as triggers) for a campaign or inventory and unleash the potential to power campaigns with unlimited data sets from a myriad of data sources. Only when the selected conditions are met will an ad or content be served onto the screen.

As the media buyer, there are a number of benefits to buying out-of-home ad space programmatically. 
 Aggregate supply: Programmatic technology provides you with a single access point for all inventory. This type of transaction usually provides additional transparency into budgeting and campaign performance metrics.
 Efficient workflow: A media buyer is able to purchase ad space with a variety of sellers without the time and hours is takes to create individual contacts with each. This allows even the smallest teams to handle large, complex campaigns by being more dynamic and efficient with how they spend their time. 
 Data-Informed Purchasing: Programmatic platforms use data to inform buying decisions for every single ad placement at the impression or spot level

As a media owner, there are a number of ways the programmatic technology can benefit you. 
 Discoverable Inventory: You can control which inventory you want to make available, to which buyers, and how much you want to charge for it.
 Fully Monetized Digital Signage Network: Programmatic technology enables you to maximize yield across your digital signage network by monetizing all available inventory through an additional sales channel that requires little direct effort.
 Curated Premium Inventory: By taking advantage of programmatic ad buying, you are able to segment target audiences more effectively and justify increased advertiser spend, by leveraging data to identify inventory that aligns with audiences.

Printed out-of-home 
Printed out of home refers to static media distributed across physical spaces. These are:

Aerial advertising Aerial advertising includes towing banners via a fixed-wing aircraft as well as airships like blimps and other airborne inflatables above beaches, events and gridlock traffic.
Billboard bicycle is a new type of mobile advertising in which a bike tows a billboard with an advertising message. This method is a cost-efficient, targeted, and environmentally-friendly form of advertising.

Brochure Distribution Information displays in public gathering spaces such as transportation centers, lodging facilities, visitor centers, attractions, and retail environments are targeted methods to distribute effective messaging to a targeted audience.  This method is slightly different from traditional OOH as the consumer self-selects the messaging material, and can take that message with them.
Billboards (or Bulletins) are usually located in highly visible, heavy traffic areas such as expressways, primary arterials, and major intersections. In the US bulletins are usually illuminated. The ad artwork, commonly digitally printed on large vinyl-coated fabric membranes, is often "rotated" by the outdoor plant operator amongst several locations in a metropolitan area to achieve the desired reach of the population as defined in the sales contract. With extended periods of high visibility, billboard advertisements provide advertisers with significant impact on commuters. This is the largest standard out of home advertising format, usually measuring at 14ftx48ft in overall size.

Bus advertising Firmly establish brand awareness and generate quick recall with high-profile exposure near point of purchase locations.
Commuter rail display Reaches a captive audience of upscale suburban commuters. Additionally, reaches lunch-time patrons, shoppers and business professionals.
ComPark advertising ComPark is a device used for car park advertising, which is placed onto the parallel lines of a bay and is able to gain instant exposure from motorists that have parked their vehicle. The ComPark also serves as a guide to assist motorist in adhering to the parking bay size.
Gas Station Pump Top Advertising Printed Signage is inserted into sign holder frames above the Pumps.  These are called Pump Top advertising and are generally eye-level height.  Average dwell time for customers to refuel their vehicle is 3-5 minutes which make this form of advertising very effective to reach automobile drivers.
Inflatable billboard similar to regular 2D billboard, but imposed on 3D object. Best used to market physical products rather than services. A cost-effective approach that is able to achieve high brand awareness and increase product purchases.
Replica Inflatable Advertising As well as Inflatable Billboards, Inflatables have become a popular form of advertising for companies looking to utilise outdoor space and venues. Many of these inflatables come in the shape of the product or logo's they are trying to sell such as Can's of Drink, Cars and other products. This form of advertising is an engaging, portable and relatively cost effective form of advertising. This is especially true at events where company want to boost their brand or product awareness or enhance their stand at the event. 

Lamppost banner advertising Lamp columns are sited everywhere, allowing advertisers and events to use banners to target precise geographical locations and create massive promotional awareness.
Mobile billboard Mobile billboards offer a great degree of flexibility to advertisers. These advertisements can target specific routes, venue or events, or can be used to achieve market saturation. A special version is the inflatable billboard which can stand free nearly everywhere.
This product can also be used for outdoor movie nights. 
Poster Target local audiences with these billboards, which are visible to vehicular traffic, and are ideal for the introduction of new products/services. Marketers use posters to achieve advertising objectives and increase brand awareness by placing multiple units in strategic locations while lowering the cost per thousand impressions. This is a standardized poster format, typically measuring 12'3" x 24'6"; formally known as a 30-Sheet Poster.
Premier panel Premiere panels combine the frequency and reach of a poster campaign with the creative impact of a bulletin.
Premier square Bright top and bottom illumination on a premiere panel provide extra impact after dark.
Street advertising The use of pavements and street furniture to create media space for brands to get their message onto the street in a cost-effective approach.

Taxi advertising Taxi advertising allows advertisers to highlight their products, whether brand awareness, or a targeted message, directly to areas where people work, shop, and play.
Wallscape Wallscapes are attached to buildings and are able to accommodate a wide variety of unusual shapes and sizes. These billboard advertisements are visible from a distance and provide impact in major metro areas.
Aircraft Advertising Aircraft advertising includes product or service branding inside and outside the aircraft. This includes wrapping the aircraft with printed SAVs, baggage tag branding, boarding pass branding, tray table branding and more.

Walking Billboards These billboards are strapped on to the human shoulder and are carried along the targeted geographic area. These billboard advertisements are also visible during night. It helps the local advertisers as it is very cost effective and can be geographically targeted to a particular area.

Other types of non-digital OOH advertising include airport displays, transit and bus-shelter displays, headrest displays, double-sided panels, junior posters and mall displays.

Regulations 
Different jurisdictions regulate outdoor advertising to different degrees.

 In the United States:
 The states of Vermont, Hawaii, Maine, and Alaska prohibit all billboards.
 The other 46 states permit multiple forms of OOH advertising.
 Billboards are regulated by all levels of government. The regulatory framework, created by the federal Highway Beautification Act (HBA), calls for billboards to be located in commercial and industrial areas. Billboard permits are issued by state and local authorities. Under the Highway Beautification Act, states have strong regulatory powers including the authority to ban billboards.
 Most states have taken steps to regulate digital (electronic) billboards, which feature static images that change (typically) every six or eight seconds. In 2007, the Federal Highway Administration (FHWA) issued Guidance to the states regarding regulation of digital billboards. Scenic America challenged the federal Guidance in federal court on procedural grounds.  On June 20, 2014, US District Court Judge James E. Boasberg dismissed this case, with prejudice.
 Regulations governing digital billboards prohibit animation and scrolling. Digital billboards are equipped with light sensors to adjust billboard lighting to surrounding light conditions to avoid glare, per the industry code.
 Sao Paulo, Brazil established an almost total outdoor advertising ban in 2006. The ban required that all billboard and banner advertisements be removed and that store signs be greatly reduced in size and prominence.

Emerging technologies 
Media fragmentation, competition from online media, as well as the need for greater efficiencies in media buying prompted companies to offer billboard inventory aggregation services
Interactive services are becoming increasingly more common with the move to digital outdoor advertising, such as allowing the public to connect, share and interact through their mobile devices in particular through WiFi connections. The technology behind these aggregated services continue to rise to the standards of mobile advertising when it comes to measurement and design abilities.

Space advertising, by use of an array of small satellites that reflect sunlight, has been evaluated by researchers at the Skolkovo Institute of Science and Technology.

See also

References

External links 

Advertising by medium